Leuda–May Historic Apartments are located approximately 3/4 of a mile south of downtown Fort Worth, Texas.  The district is composed of five buildings that were built between 1914 and 1936.  Three of the buildings are apartment buildings and the other two are 2-story garage/apartment buildings.

It was added to the National Register on May 30, 2005.

See also

National Register of Historic Places listings in Tarrant County, Texas

References

External links

National Register of Historic Places in Fort Worth, Texas
Historic districts in Fort Worth, Texas
Historic districts on the National Register of Historic Places in Texas